Polydoros Gezos (born 3 September 1994) is a Greek professional footballer who plays as a defensive midfielder for Austrian club Austria Klagenfurt.

Personal life
Gezos' older brother, Kosmas, is also a professional footballer.

References

1994 births
Living people
Greek expatriate footballers
Super League Greece players
2. Liga (Austria) players
Gamma Ethniki players
Panionios F.C. players
A.E. Kifisia F.C. players
Ilisiakos F.C. players
SK Austria Klagenfurt players
Association football midfielders
Footballers from Athens
Greek footballers